The Commune is a 2016 Danish drama film directed by Thomas Vinterberg. It was selected to compete for the Golden Bear at the 66th Berlin International Film Festival. At Berlin, Trine Dyrholm won the Silver Bear for Best Actress. It was named as one of three films that could be chosen as the Danish submission for the Best Foreign Language Film at the 89th Academy Awards, but it was not selected.

Cast
 Ulrich Thomsen as Erik
 Fares Fares as Allon
 Trine Dyrholm as Anna
  as Mona
 Lars Ranthe as Ole

Reception
The Commune has a 71% approval rating on Rotten Tomatoes based on 94 reviews, with an average rating of 6.4/10. The website critics’ consensus reads: “The Commune may not stand with Thomas Vinterberg's greatest work, but the end results remain thought-provoking and overall absorbing.” According to Metacritic, which sampled 22 critics and calculated an average score of 60 out of 100, the film received “mixed or average reviews”.

References

External links
 

2016 films
2016 drama films
Danish drama films
2010s Danish-language films
Films directed by Thomas Vinterberg
Films with screenplays by Tobias Lindholm
Films set in the 1970s
Films set in Copenhagen